Gehofen is a municipality in the district Kyffhäuserkreis, in Thuringia, Germany.

People from Gehofen 
 Ernst Albrecht von Eberstein (1605-1677), Saxon Field Marshal

References

Municipalities in Thuringia
Kyffhäuserkreis